Glenfield is a locality north of Geraldton,  Western Australia. Its local government area is the City of Greater Geraldton.

The suburb was gazetted in 1979.

Geography
It is bounded on the west by the Indian Ocean, on the south by Chapman Road and Chapman Valley Road, and on the east by North West Coastal Highway.

Demography

References

Suburbs of Geraldton